Robbers Cave State Park is a state park in Latimer County, Oklahoma. Originally named Latimer State Park, it received its current name in 1936. It is located in the scenic, hilly woodlands of the Sans Bois Mountains of southeast Oklahoma. This park is a favorite of rappellers, equestrians, hikers and outdoor lovers. It offers visitors acres of discovery and enjoyment including trout fishing in season, boating, hunting, mountain biking, trails for hikers and horses, sandstone cliffs for climbing and rappelling, and fall foliage viewing. In addition, Robbers Cave is historically notable as a former hideout for infamous outlaws Belle Starr and Jesse James.

History
The area surrounding the present-day park has been a hunting ground for hundreds of years. Archaeological evidence suggests that the earliest people were related to the builders of the Spiro Mounds. By the 1600s, the Osage and Caddo tribes dominated the area. French hunters and explorers also visited, leaving their mark by naming some of the prominent geographic features, which are still used.

In 1850 the area of Robbers Cave was assigned to the newly established Sans Bois County, a part of the Moshulatubbee District of the Choctaw Nation.

After the Civil War, this area became legendary for sheltering fugitives from the law. Some of these included Jesse James and Belle Starr.  Other fugitives included the Dalton Gang, the Youngers and the Rufus Buck Gang.

In 1929, Carlton Weaver, an editor and politician from Wilburton, donated 120 acres of land near Robbers Cave to the Boy Scouts of America for a campground. The warden of the Oklahoma State Penitentiary arranged for skilled prison inmates to construct camp improvements, including a kitchen and several other buildings, from rock quarried nearby. The new facility was named Camp Tom Hale, for a McAlester resident and Boy Scout supporter.  The camp was adjacent to a tract of land that Weaver had leased to create a game preserve. Weaver later donated the preserve to the Oklahoma Fish and Game Commission.

The Civilian Conservation Corps (CCC) was organized in 1933. Supervised by the National Park Service, the CCC built a bathhouse, cabins, trails, group camps, shelters, and roads. In 1937, CCC and the Works Progress Administration (WPA) created Lake Carlton, named for Carlton Weaver.

In 1987, the park initiated the first annual Robbers Cave Fall Festival, and the Robbers Cave Bluegrass Festival began in 1988. In 1994, Oklahoma converted the bathhouse to a nature center. The park was added to the National Register of Historic Places (NR 96000489) in 2002.

Park facilities

The park encompasses three lakes: Lake Carlton, Lake Wayne Wallace and Coon Creek Lake. These were created by dams built on Fourche Maline Creek, a tributary of Poteau River.

RV sites, tent sites and equestrian campsites are available and lodging facilities at Robbers Cave State Park include the Belle Starr View Lodge, several cabins and two group camps. Leashed pets are allowed in the park and in some cabins. Picnic tables, comfort stations with showers, boat ramps, a swimming beach, swimming pool with bathhouse, playgrounds, miniature golf, hiking trails, horseback riding stables, paddle boat rentals, small grocery store, on-site restaurant, and a nature center with naturalist programs and exhibits round out the park's facilities. Two tennis courts, a basketball court and a walking track are also available a few miles from the park.  Several miles of trails are scattered throughout the park. Horses can be rented to follow the trails. One of the trails is northwest of the cave area and travels around Lost Lake.

The Boy Scout camp within the park was the site of Muzafer Sherif's Robber's Cave study on realistic conflict theory.

Fees
To help fund a backlog of deferred maintenance and park improvements, the state implemented an entrance fee for this park and 21 others effective June 15, 2020.  The fees, charged per vehicle, start at $10 per day for a single-day or $8 for residents with an Oklahoma license plate or Oklahoma tribal plate.  Fees are waived for honorably discharged veterans and Oklahoma residents age 62 and older and their spouses.  Passes good for three days or a week are also available; annual passes good at all 22 state parks charging fees are offered at a cost of $75 for out-of-state visitors or $60 for Oklahoma residents.  The 22 parks are:

 Arrowhead Area at Lake Eufaula State Park
 Beavers Bend State Park
 Boiling Springs State Park
 Cherokee Landing State Park
 Fort Cobb State Park
 Foss State Park
 Honey Creek Area at Grand Lake State Park
 Great Plains State Park
 Great Salt Plains State Park
 Greenleaf State Park
 Keystone State Park
 Lake Eufaula State Park
 Lake Murray State Park
 Lake Texoma State Park
 Lake Thunderbird State Park
 Lake Wister State Park
 Natural Falls State Park
 Osage Hills State Park
 Robbers Cave State Park
 Sequoyah State Park
 Tenkiller State Park
 Twin Bridges Area at Grand Lake State Park

References

External links
 Robbers Cave State Park

Caves of Oklahoma
Landforms of Latimer County, Oklahoma
National Park Service Rustic architecture
National Register of Historic Places in Latimer County, Oklahoma
Nature centers in Oklahoma
Parks on the National Register of Historic Places in Oklahoma
Protected areas of Latimer County, Oklahoma
State parks of Oklahoma